Francisco Avilán Cruz (27 August 1947 – 5 February 2021) was a Mexican footballer and football manager.

Early life
Born in Monterrey, Mexico, Avilán's father was an amateur footballer and his brother, Arnulfo, played for Monterrey. His other brother, Pedro, played in the Mexican second division.

He followed in the footsteps of his brother Arnulfo when he joined Monterrey in 1958.

Club career
Avilán was handed his first team debut by Uruguayan manager Roberto Scarone in 1964 against Club Deportivo Nacional, helping Monterrey to a 2–0 win. He remained with Monterrey until 1970, when he had a short stint with Atlas, before returning to Monterrey. He signed with Guadalajara before retiring in 1974.

International career
He was called up to the Mexico national football team on several occasions, making two appearances between 1971 and 1972. In doing so, he became the first Monterrey player to represent Mexico.

Managerial career
Avilán returned to Monterrey at the end of the 1970s, initially managing the youth sector, which included future Mexican internationals Francisco Javier Cruz, Héctor Becerra and Missael Espinoza. 

After studying football management in Yugoslavia, Avilán was named manager of Monterrey in 1984. With signings such as Guillermo Muñoz, he led Monterrey to the México 86 title, the first in the club's history.

While serving as manager of the Mexico national under-20 football team, it was found Mexico had knowingly fielded four overage players at the 1988 CONCACAF U-20 Tournament. The scandal, known as Cachirules, saw several Mexican officials banned from football for life; however, Avilán himself received no sanction, and said that if he had known these players were overaged, he would not have selected them.

Avilán returned to management in 2008, when he was named manager of Jaguares de Chiapas on an interim basis.

Death
Avilán died in February 2021, following a bout of COVID-19.

Career statistics

International

Managerial statistics

References

1947 births
2021 deaths
Deaths from the COVID-19 pandemic in Mexico
Mexican footballers
Mexico international footballers
Sportspeople from Monterrey
Association football forwards
C.F. Monterrey players
Atlas F.C. footballers
C.D. Guadalajara footballers
C.F. Monterrey managers
Tigres UANL managers
Chiapas F.C. managers
Mexican expatriate football managers
Mexican expatriate sportspeople in Honduras
Expatriate football managers in Honduras